Schoenfels is a village in the commune of Mersch, in central Luxembourg.  , the village has a population of 208.  It is the location of Junction 3 of the A7 motorway, which goes from Luxembourg City to Clervaux.

History
The hamlet of Schoenfels is first mentioned by the name of Scindalasheim in a deed of 846 as a gift by Bishop Hetto of Trier to Abbot Marcuardus of Prüm.

References
 

Mersch
Towns in Luxembourg